Caprice is a suburb of Accra near the Kwame Nkrumah Circle in the Accra Metropolitan District in the Greater Accra Region of Ghana. The City Business College is located in Caprice. Caprice is a neighborhood around the National Police Training School.

References 

Populated places in the Greater Accra Region
Greater Accra Region